The Women's time trial H1-2 road cycling event at the 2012 Summer Paralympics took place on September 5 at Brands Hatch. Seven riders from five different nations competed - in practice all 7 were classified H2. The race distance was 16 km.

Results

References

Women's road time trial H1-2
2012 in women's road cycling